Rabia Kayahan (born 2000) is a Turkish armwrestler competing in the 65 kg category. She is a world and European medalist.

Private life 
Rabia Kayahan was born in Torul district of Gümüşhane Province, Turkey in 2000. She lost her mother in 2019.

She finished the İmam Hatip High School in her hometown. She is a student of Physical Education and Sports at Bayburt University.

Sports career 
Kayahan started performing arm wrestling with the encouragement of her teacher of Physical education in the senior year of high school. She was motivated by her father and older sisters for this sport. She is a member of Gümüşhane Kayak S.K. (Ski club).

At her first participation at the Turkish Championship in 2017, she placed first on the left arm anf third on the right. Admitted to the national team, she debuted at the 2018 European Championship held in Sofia, Bulgaria. She became European champion on both arms in the Youth 70 kg catehory. The same year, she took the bronze medal on the right arm at the World Championship in Antalya, Turkey. In 2019, she took the bronze medal on the left arm and the silver medal on the right in the Youth 70 kg category at the European Championship in Loutraki, Greece. In March 2020, Kayahan won two gold medals in the 70 kg category at the Turkish Untrauniversity  Tournament in Antalya. From the 2021 World Armwrestling Championship in Bucharest, Romania, she returned home with two bronze medals won on both arms in the 65 kg category. She confirmed her champion title on both arms in the Turkish Championship in March 2022. At the 2022 World Armwrestling Championship in Antalya, she placed 6th on the left arm.

International individual achievements

References 

2000 births
Living people
Sportspeople from Gümüşhane
Imam Hatip school alumni
Female arm wrestlers
Turkish arm wrestlers
Turkish sportswomen